Dimitar Bobchev (20 September 1926 – 12 March 2015) was a Bulgarian cyclist. He competed in the 4,000 metres team pursuit at the 1952 Summer Olympics.

References

1926 births
2015 deaths
Bulgarian male cyclists
Olympic cyclists of Bulgaria
Cyclists at the 1952 Summer Olympics